Sex Playlist is the fourth studio album by American singer Omarion. The album was released on December 2, 2014 under Maybach Music Group and Atlantic Records. The album serves as the follow-up to his third album Ollusion (2010).

Background
In November 2014, Omarion released the track listing and release date for the album. This album is his first full-length release from Maybach Music Group. He later released the album cover artwork which features Apryl Jones, Omarion's girlfriend, straddling him.

Omarion described the album as more mature and concept driven then his previous releases. He said, "It's not about just having a sex playlist, it's about having the right sex playlist, because you can't have sex without love… It's not just about the lustful idea of sex. It's a playlist for the lovers."

Singles
The album's lead single, titled "You Like It", was released on February 14, 2014.

The album's second single "Post to Be" featuring Chris Brown and Jhené Aiko, was released on November 11, 2014. The song was a big success, reaching number 13 on the US Billboard Hot 100 and has since been certified triple platinum by the Recording Industry Association of America (RIAA).

Critical reception

Sex Playlist received positive reviews by music critics. Andy Kellman of AllMusic said "After some snags, Omarion finally released his first Maybach Music Group album, Sex Playlist, in late 2014. While it was issued only as a digital download, it deserved a full promotional push and physical release from Maybach parent label Atlantic, as it was one of the year's best sets of contemporary R&B. True to its title, Sex Playlist is more slow jam-oriented than any of Omarion's Epic and EMI albums." Justin Charity from Complex called the album "one of the most mature, refined, restrained male R&B projects from a major artist" from 2014. He went on to say that Omarion sounded more evolved and the album was more sincere and coherent.

Commercial performance
Sex Playlist debuted at number 49 on the US Billboard 200, selling 16,000 copies with minimal album promotion. In its second week, the album sold 5,000 more copies. After the release of the clip, the album re-entered the Billboard 200 and went on to sell over 23,000 copies in the United States. On December 13, 2014, Sex Playlist peaked at number two on the US R&B Albums Chart.

Track listing

Charts

Weekly charts

References 

2014 albums
Omarion albums
Maybach Music Group albums
Atlantic Records albums
Albums produced by Eric Hudson
Albums produced by DJ Mustard
Albums produced by Rock City